The non-marine molluscs of Mayotte are a part of the molluscan fauna of Mayotte.

Freshwater gastropods

Land gastropods 

Pomatiidae
 Tropidophora semilineata - extinct

Cyclophoridae
 Cyclophorus horridulum - extinct
 Cyclosurus mariei Morelet, 1881 - extinct

Cerastidae
 Rhachis comorensis - extinct

Streptaxidae
 Gulella mayottensis - extinct
 Pseudelma Kobelt, 1904

Freshwater bivalves

See also
 List of marine molluscs of Mayotte
 List of non-marine molluscs of Mauritius
 List of non-marine molluscs of the Seychelles
 List of non-marine molluscs of Madagascar

References

Molluscs

Molluscs
Mayotte
Mayotte